The Caledonian Railway 782 Class was a class of  steam locomotives designed by John F. McIntosh and introduced in 1896.  The 29 Class was similar but fitted with condensing apparatus. The locomotives were taken  into London, Midland and Scottish Railway (LMS) ownership in 1923 and into British Railways (BR) ownership in 1948.

Numbering
29 Class
 LMS numbers 16231-16239
 BR numbers 56231-56239

782 Class
 LMS numbers 16240-16376
 BR numbers 56240-56376

Sources

 Ian Allan ABC of British Railways Locomotives, 1948 edition, part 3, pp 46-47

See also
 Locomotives of the Caledonian Railway

External links
 Rail UK database Class 782

782
0-6-0T locomotives
Railway locomotives introduced in 1896